Leonardo Di Cosmo (born 31 October 1998) is an Italian football player who plays as a midfielder for  club Trento.

Career

Fidelis Andria 
On 18 November 2017, Di Cosmo made his professional debut, in Serie C, for Fidelis Andria, as a substitute replacing Francesco De Giorgi in the 81st minute of a 5–1 away win over Akragas. On 30 December he played his first match as a starter for Fidelis Andria, a 2–0 home win over Siracusa, he was replaced by Felipe Curcio in the 58th minute. On 25 February 2018 he played his first entire match, a 1–0 away win over Paganese.

Virtus Entella

Loans to Virtus Francavilla
On 9 July 2019, he joined Virtus Francavilla on loan.

After appearing on the bench for Entella in the second game of the 2020–21 Serie B season, on 5 October 2020 he returned to Virtus Francavilla on another loan.

Trento
On 10 January 2023, Di Cosmo signed a 2.5-year contract with Trento.

Career statistics

References

External links 
 

1998 births
Living people
People from Andria
Sportspeople from the Province of Barletta-Andria-Trani
Footballers from Apulia
Italian footballers
Association football midfielders
Serie C players
S.S. Fidelis Andria 1928 players
Virtus Entella players
Virtus Francavilla Calcio players
A.C. Trento 1921 players